Sharon Lutheran Church and Cemetery is a historic Lutheran church and cemetery located near Ceres, Bland County, Virginia. The church was built in 1883, and is a one-story, frame church, four bays long, with round-arched, stained-glass windows and a gable roof.  It features a projecting square tower with a bell-cast pyramidal roof and cross finial on the entrance facade.  The adjacent cemetery was established in 1817, and includes a collection of rare Germanic gravestones which are stylistically related to those found in the outlying churches of the Wythe County German settlements.

It was listed on the National Register of Historic Places in 1979.

References

External links
 
 
 

Funerary art
Lutheran churches in Virginia
Cemeteries in Bland County, Virginia
Churches completed in 1883
19th-century Lutheran churches in the United States
Buildings and structures in Bland County, Virginia
Churches on the National Register of Historic Places in Virginia
National Register of Historic Places in Bland County, Virginia
Cemeteries in Virginia
Lutheran cemeteries in the United States
1817 establishments in Virginia